A competency architecture is a framework of predetermined skills or "competencies" used in an educational setting. Competency architectures are a core component of competency-based learning.

See also
 Competency-based learning

References

Further reading 
 Defining A Competency Architecture And All Of Its Components
 Personalreferent (in German)
 Competency Architecture

Human resource management